Desiderio Guillermo Medina Saravia (10 October 1919 – 17 June 1986) was a Chilean footballer. He played in twelve matches for the Chile national football team from 1941 to 1946. He was also part of Chile's squad for the 1941 South American Championship.

References

External links
 

1919 births
1986 deaths
Chilean footballers
Chile international footballers
Place of birth missing
Association football forwards
Everton de Viña del Mar footballers
Santiago National F.C. players